Taininbeka is an atoll in Fiji, a member of the Ringgold Isles archipelago, which forms an outlier group to the northern island of Vanua Levu.  This uninhabited islet is situated at 16.04° South and 179.09° East, and has a total land area of 144.34ha.

See also

 Desert island
 List of islands

Uninhabited islands of Fiji
Ringgold Isles